Owen Davies may refer to:

 Owen Davies (Baptist minister) (1840–1929), Welsh Baptist minister
 Owen Davies (historian) (born 1969), English historian
 Owen Davies (umpire) (1914–1978), West Indian cricket umpire
 Owen Picton Davies (1872–1940), Welsh businessman and politician
 Owen Picton Davies (journalist) (1882–1970), Welsh journalist

See also

 Owen Davis
 Owen Davis, Jr.